Solistes de Musique Ancienne, also known as Solistes, is a London-based ensemble specialising in Baroque music.

Founded in 2010 by conductor Joel Newsome, it draws its members from London conservatoires and young professional classical musicians at the start of their careers. It performs as both an orchestra and choir, together or separately, using minimal force in performance, and often with one musician per part. Soloists are provided from within the group rather than by external invitation.

They played their first concert in St James's Church, Piccadilly in October 2010, with Handel's rarely heard "Ode for the Birthday of Queen Anne" and Bach's "Brandenburg Concerto no.2". In March 2011 they performed Bach's "Easter Oratorio" and Allegri's "Miserere" at Holy Trinity, Sloane Street.

References

External links
 Solistes de Musique Ancienne website
 St James's Church,Piccadilly
 Holy Trinity Church, Sloane Street

London orchestras
Early music orchestras
Musical groups established in 2010
2010 in London
2010 establishments in England